In flag terminology, a swallowtail is either 
 a V-shaped cut in a flag that causes the flag to end in two points at the fly; or 
 any flag that has this V-shaped cut.
The name comes from the forked tail that is a common feature of the swallow species of birds.



Variants

Double-pointed
Common in the Nordic countries, this swallowtail flag contains a vertical section in the centre of the fly.

Swallowtail with tongue
Also common in the Nordic countries, the swallowtail flag contains a third tail (the "tongue") between the other two tails.

Triangular swallowtail
The triangular swallowtail is the shape of the flag of the American state of Ohio, as well as of some burgees, private signals and pennants of the International Code of Signals (ICS).

Guidon
A guidon is the general name given to a small swallowtail flag. Guidons are used to represent military units and are displayed on vehicles attached to a particular unit. In some countries (such as the United States), guidons do not necessarily have a swallow tail. 

The military use of the guidon originated from the flags used by cavalry units in Europe. A variant of the guidon, the hussar cut, was used by German cavalry regiments. Instead of a straight V-shaped cut, the swallowtail in a hussar cut flag is curved.

Types of flags